The Washington and Lee Generals are the athletic teams that represent Washington and Lee University, located in Lexington, Virginia, in NCAA Division III intercollegiate sports. The Generals compete as members of the Old Dominion Athletic Conference for all sports except wrestling, which competes in the Centennial Conference. All together, Washington and Lee sponsors 25 sports: 13 for men and 12 for women.

Washington and Lee was one of the founding members of the Virginia Intercollegiate Athletic Association in 1900, as well as the Division I Southern Conference in 1921. The Generals remained members of the SoCon until 1958. During this time, they played alongside other Virginia universities like Virginia, Virginia Tech, VMI (also located in Lexington), and William & Mary. Generals basketball won the Southern Conference twice: 1934 and 1937. The football team even made an appearance in the 1951 Gator Bowl against Wyoming.

After leaving the Southern Conference, the Generals moved into Division III and joined the College Athletic Conference in 1962. This was followed by a move to the Old Dominion Athletic Conference in 1976, also as a founding member. Washington & Lee's men's lacrosse remained the school's only Division I program until 1987.

Varsity teams

List of teams

Men's sports
 Baseball
 Basketball
 Cross Country
 Football
 Golf
 Indoor Track & Field
 Lacrosse
 Outdoor Track & Field
 Riding
 Soccer
 Swimming
 Tennis
 Wrestling

Women's sports
 Basketball
 Cross Country
 Field Hockey
 Golf
 Indoor Track & Field
 Lacrosse
 Outdoor Track & Field
 Riding
 Soccer
 Swimming
 Tennis
 Volleyball

Individual teams

National championships
Washington and Lee holds two NCAA National Championship titles.  In 1988, the men's tennis team won the NCAA Division III National Championship title. In 2007, the women's tennis team claimed the NCAA Division III National Championship title. In 2006, 2010, 2011, 2012, 2015, 2017, and 2021 the Generals football team won the Old Dominion Athletic Conference championship. In 2009, the Generals baseball team won the ODAC championship.

Men's lacrosse
Washington and Lee's first lacrosse team was fielded in 1938 and started the Dixie Lacrosse League along with Virginia, Duke, and North Carolina.  The Generals soon were successful winning the Dixie League Championship in 1939 and 1940.  No team was fielded from 1943 through 1946.  The team resumed play in 1947.

After the school downgraded to Division III in 1958, the men's lacrosse team remained at the Division I level until 1987. Washington and Lee participated in seven NCAA Division I Men's Lacrosse Championship tournaments: 1972, 1973, 1974, 1975, 1976, 1977, 1978, 1980. The Generals reached the tournament's semifinals three times: 1973, 1974, and 1975.

Since 1987, Washington and Lee have won eleven Old Dominion Athletic Conference (ODAC) Lacrosse Championships: 1991, 1993, 1994, 1995, 1999, 2000, 2002, 2004, 2009, 2016, and 2019.  Washington and Lee have  participated in thirteen NCAA Division III Men's Lacrosse Championship tournaments: 1987, 1991, 1993, 1998, 1999, 2000, 2002, 2004, 2009, 2013, 2016, 2018 and 2019. The Generals reached the quarterfinals three times: 1998, 1999, and 2004. The Generals reached the semifinals three times: 1987, 2000, and 2002.

Washington and Lee Hall of Fame Coach Jack Emmer is known for creating The Armadillo play where five players would surround a player with the ball, facing him and locking arms showing the defense only their backs.  Any attempt by the defense to retrieve the ball would result in a penalty.  Washington and Lee would then be able to run a man-up offense as a result of the penalty.  Washington and Lee successfully used this play during the 1982 game against UNC.  Following the game, The Armadillo was outlawed by the NCAA rules committee.

Washington and Lee lacrosse is also known for being on the losing side of one of the greatest upsets in lacrosse history when unranked Morgan State defeated the number 1 ranked Generals in the first game of the season in 1975.  W&L had a 28 game regular season winning streak and had not lost at home in three years at the time.

Washington and Lee plays VMI in the Lee-Jackson Lacrosse Classic every year.  VMI is W&L's next door neighbor in Lexington, VA.  The Classic is named after Robert E. Lee and Stonewall Jackson. Lee served as W&L's president from 1865-1870 and Jackson was a professor at VMI from 1851-1861.  The Classic was held every spring as part of the main lacrosse season until 2007 when it moved to the fall as an exhibition game.  W&L holds a 31-4 lead in the all time series against VMI.  The trophy is a plaque featuring crossed swords.

Washington and Lee competes against Christopher Newport every year for the Virginia LtN Cup and generates support for LtN.  LtN or "Lacrosse the Nations" is an organization that uses lacrosse and other physical activities to teach important life skills and help improve education and health while creating opportunity and hope for children in need.  W&L holds a 6-3 lead in the all time series against Christopher Newport.

References

External links